Leonard E. Scott (March 25, 1917 – February 1, 1986) was an American politician and World War II veteran from the state of Iowa

Scott was born in Centerville, Appanoose County, Iowa in 1917. He graduated from Mystic High School in 1934. Scott served as a Republican for one term in the Iowa House of Representatives from January 13, 1947, to January 9, 1949. He died in Carson City, Nevada in February 1986.

References

1917 births
1986 deaths
People from Centerville, Iowa
Republican Party members of the Iowa House of Representatives
20th-century American politicians
American military personnel of World War II